Benefits of Thinking Out Loud, released in 2001 through Tank Records, is the second full-length release from the Massachusetts based melodic hardcore band now known as A Wilhelm Scream.

Information
Originally recorded and released through Tank Records in 2001 under their at the time current name, Smackin' Isaiah. Oddly enough, the album was sold in DVD covers, not regular CD covers. The record has been described by the band to be their first serious approach.

The band promoted the album with a handful of shows as part of the Warped Tour, which were bookended by headlining shows in June and July 2002. After signing with Jump Start Records in 2002, the new label reissued the album twice, first in 2002 and again in 2003. The first reissue was done under the name Smackin' Isaiah, in promotion of their signing, whilst the second under A Wilhelm Scream, promoting their name change. The 2003 reissue sold better than expected, leading to a repressing in 2004.

The album artwork for the original and first reissue are identical, whilst the second reissue, though being very similar, has some alterations. The first obviously being which band name is featured (Smackin' Isaiah on the original release and first reissue, A Wilhelm Scream on the second), followed by location of the album title (centered over the band name on the original release and first reissue and right under the band name on the second) and then location of the hangman (hanging from the second 'I' in Isaiah on the original release and first reissue and from the "I" in Wilhelm on the second). There has also been observed a third version of the album art, where the hangman hangs from the "M" in Wilhelm and the album title is left under the band name, however this has been confirmed by Jeremy Myers of Jump Start Records to only have been used for promotion and sales before the release of the second reissue. Before being sent off for print, the cover was changed in the way of the second reissue and has therefore never been printed. Additionally, photos and credits for John Carvalho were removed from the liner notes after the first pressing.

Track listing
Lyrics by Trevor Reilly, with the exceptions of #3 by Reilly and Nuno Pereira, #8 by Reilly, Pereira and Jonathan Teves, #9 by Teves and #11 by Nicholas Pasquale Angelini. Music by A Wilhelm Scream.

Personnel
 Nuno Pereira - vocals
 Trevor Reilly - guitar, backing vocals
 John Carvalho - guitar
 Jonathan Teves - bass, backing vocals
 Nicholas Pasquale Angelini - drums

Details
 Engineered, mixed and mastered by Joe Reilly
 Produced by Joe Reilly and Smackin' Isaiah
 Recorded at Black and Blue Studio, New Bedford, MA
 Distributed by Morphius Distribution (2003 reissue) and RED Distribution (2004 repressing)

References

A Wilhelm Scream albums
2001 albums